Praxis edwardsii, or Edward's praxis, is a moth of the family Noctuidae. The species was first described by Achille Guenée in 1852. It is found in Australia in Queensland, New South Wales, the Australian Capital Territory, Victoria, Tasmania, South Australia and Western Australia.

References

Catocalinae
Moths of Australia
Moths described in 1852